The Men's points race event of the 2008 UCI Track Cycling World Championships was held on 28 March 2008.

Results

References

External links
 Full results at Tissottiming.com

Men's points race
UCI Track Cycling World Championships – Men's points race